Princess Alice (Alicia) of Bourbon-Parma may refer to:

 Princess Alice of Bourbon-Parma (born 1849), daughter of Charles III, Duke of Parma and Princess Louise of Artois; married Ferdinand IV, Grand Duke of Tuscany
 Princess Alicia of Bourbon-Parma (1917–2017), daughter of Elias, Duke of Parma and Archduchess Maria Anna of Austria; married Infante Alfonso, Duke of Calabria 
 Princess Alice of Bourbon-Parma (born 2000), great-granddaughter of Prince René of Bourbon-Parma and Princess Margaret of Denmark. She is also the grandniece of Anne of Bourbon-Parma, who was the last queen of Romania.